Huang Zuoxing (born October 1948) is a retired lieutenant general in the People's Liberation Army of China. He was a member of the 17th Central Commission for Discipline Inspection. He was a delegate to the 10th National People's Congress.

Biography
Huang was born in Wugong County, Shaanxi, in October 1948. He enlisted in the People's Liberation Army (PLA) in March 1968, and joined the Chinese Communist Party (CCP) in February 1969. He was assigned to the Taiyuan Satellite Launch Center in 1968, and eventually becoming its political commissar in May 2000. In August 2006, he was promoted to become deputy political commissar of the People's Liberation Army General Armaments Department, a position he held until December 2011.

He was promoted to the rank of major general (shaojiang) in July 1997 and lieutenant general (zhongjiang) in July 2007.

References

1948 births
Living people
People from Wugong County
Central Party School of the Chinese Communist Party alumni
PLA National Defence University alumni
People's Liberation Army generals from Shaanxi
Delegates to the 10th National People's Congress